Donato Martuccio and Donato Maricucci was a Roman Catholic prelate who served as Bishop of Sarno (1547–1548), Bishop of Lavello (1545–1547), and Bishop of Minervino Murge (1536–1545).

Biography
On 11 February 1536, Donato Martuccio was appointed during the papacy of Pope Paul III as Bishop of Minervino Murge.
On 2 March 1545, he was appointed during the papacy of Pope Paul III as Bishop of Lavello.
On 16 March 1547, he was appointed during the papacy of Pope Paul III as Bishop of Sarno.
He served as Bishop of Sarno until his resignation in 1548.

References

External links and additional sources
 (for Chronology of Bishops) 
 (for Chronology of Bishops) 
 (Chronology of Bishops) 
 (Chronology of Bishops) 
 (for Chronology of Bishops) 
 (for Chronology of Bishops) 

\

16th-century Italian Roman Catholic bishops
Bishops appointed by Pope Paul III